The Lambretta Model A is the first production model of Lambretta scooters. It was Ferdinando Innocenti's idea of a cheap type of transport for Italy in the mid-late 1940s.

Overview
The Lambretta Model A was the first production scooter from Ferdinando Innocenti's Lambretta. It was designed because Ferdinando Innocenti realised the importance of cheap transport to rebuild Post-War Italy. The bike's design was radical for its time but was also easy to operate. The bike was produced from October 1947-October 1948 and sold 9,669 units.

Design 

The tubular frame was made of 2 sections; the front end was made of pressed steel connected to the steering and front forks. It came with a tool box, gear indicator, foot pedal gears and an oil measuring jug integrated into the petrol tank cap. The 123cc engine was shaft driven and direct air cooled. The Model A also came with a 3-Speed Gear Box, the front forks consisted of 2 bushes only and there was no rear suspension. It came with drum brakes and 7 inch chrome wheel rims.

Sales and Production 

The Lambretta Model A sold badly in the first 2 months only moving 47 units but production picked up and in the last 5 months they were producing over 1,000 units a month.

References

External links 

Motor scooters
Innocenti vehicles